Zug (Standard German: ,; ; ;) is the largest town and capital of the Swiss canton of Zug in Switzerland. Its name originates from the fishing vocabulary; in the Middle Ages it referred to the right to pull up fishing nets and hence to the right to fish.

The official language of Zug is the Swiss variety of Standard German, but the main spoken language is the local variant of the Alemannic Swiss German dialect.

History

Prehistory
The oldest evidence of humans in the area trace back to 14,000 BC. There have been Paleolithic finds on the north bank of Lake Zug, which come from nomadic hunters and gatherers. Archaeologists have also found over forty lake-shore settlements, known as pile dwellings, on the shores of Lake Zug from the epoch of the first settled farmers in the Neolithic period (5,500-2,200 BC). The peak in these lake-shore village settlements was between 3800 and 2450 BC. For the same epoch, the first pre-alpine land use has been found in Menzingen and in the Ägeri valley. The well-known, historically-researched lake-shore village  'Sumpf'  (the swamp), dated from the late Bronze Age (up until 850 BC). Evidence from these finds resulted in a quite different picture of life in former times, which is on display at the Zug Museum for Prehistory. In addition, finds from the Iron Age (850-50 BC) and the Roman and Celtic-Roman time (from 50 BC) have been unearthed.

Kyburg foundation
In around AD 600, Alemannic families and tribes immigrated to the area of present-day canton Zug. The name Blickensdorf, and place names with '- ikon' endings, prove this as the first Alemannic living space. The churches of Baar and Risch also date back to the early Middle Ages. The first written document on the area originates from the year 858, and refers to King Ludwig the German giving the farm Chama (Cham) to the Zürich Fraumünster convent. At this time, the area of present-day Zug belonged to completely different monastic and secular landlords, the most important of whom were the Habsburgs, and who, in 1264, inherited the Kyburg rights and remained a central political power until about 1400.

In the course of the high medieval town construction, the settlement of Zug also received a town wall at some point after 1200. The town founders were probably the counts of Kyburg. The town, first mentioned in AD 1240, was called an "oppidum" in 1242 and a "castrum" in 1255. In 1273, it was bought by Rudolph of Habsburg from Anna, the heiress of Kyburg and wife of Eberhard, head of the cadet line of Habsburg. Through this purchase it passed into the control of the Habsburgs and was placed under a Habsburg bailiff. The Aeusser Amt or Outer District consisted of the villages and towns surrounding Zug, which each had their own Landsgemeinden but were ruled by a single Habsburg bailiff. Zug was important as an administrative center of the Kyburg and the Habsburg district, then as a local market place, and, thereafter, as a stage town for the transport of goods (particularly salt and iron) over the Hirzel hill towards Lucerne.

Joining the Swiss Confederation
On 27 June 1352, both the town of Zug and the Aeusser Amt entered the Swiss Confederation, the latter being received on exactly the same terms as the town, and not, as was usual in the case of outer districts, as a subject land. However, in September 1352 Zug had to acknowledge its own lords again, and in 1355 was obliged to break off its connection with the league. About 1364, the town and the Aeusser Amt were recovered for the league by the men of Schwyz, and from this time Zug took part as a full member in all the acts of the league. In 1379, the Holy Roman Emperor Wenceslaus exempted Zug from all external jurisdictions, and in 1389 the Habsburgs renounced their claims, reserving only an annual payment of 20 silver marks, which came to an end in 1415. In 1400 Wenceslaus gave all criminal jurisdiction to the town only. The Aeusser Amt, in 1404, then claimed that the banner and seal of Zug should be kept in one of the country districts and were supported in this claim by Schwyz. The matter was finally settled in 1412 by arbitration, and the banner was to be kept in the town. Finally in 1415, the right of electing their landammann was given to Zug by the Confederation, and a share in the criminal jurisdiction was granted to the Aeusser Amt by German king Sigismund.

The alliance of the four forest cantons of Uri, Schwyz, Unterwalden and Lucerne with the city of Zürich in 1351 set much in motion. The town of Zug was seen as having Habsburg ties with the cities of Zürich and Lucerne, and therefore had to be conquered. It is likely that this was more for political than economic reasons: the Lucerne market was very important for central Switzerland, but also strongly dependent on the city of Zürich. Zürich initiated a siege on Zug with the federal army in June 1352. Zug surrendered. On 27 June 1352 Zürich, Luzern, Zug, Uri, Schwyz and Unterwalden formed an alliance. Zürich's saw this 'Zugerbund' (Zug alliance) as an alliance of convenience. For the town of Zug, little changed, and Zug remained Habsburg. That same year, the Zug alliance was declared invalid by all parties. A period of Schwyz domination then followed. Only gradually did Zug become sovereign and federal.

Simultaneously, Zug expanded its territory, acquiring a number of rural areas in the form of bailiwicks (Walchwil, Cham, Gangolfswil [Risch] Hünenberg and Steinhausen, and Oberrüti, now part of the canton of Aargau). Zug became a confederation in itself – with the town and its subject territories, and the three outer ('free') municipalities, Ägeri, Menzingen (with Neuheim) and Baar. This problematic dualism dominated until 1798, i.e. until the end of the old confederation, the political structure of the Canton Zug. The unifying element of this miniature confederation was, among others, the rural municipalities and the forty-member city council.

Growth of the town
In 1385, Zug joined the league of the Swabian cities against Leopold III of Austria and shared in the victory of Sempach, as well as in the various Argovian (1415) and Thurgovian (1460) conquests of the Confederates, and later in those of Italy (1512), having already taken part in the occupation of the Val d'Ossola. Between 1379 (Walchwil) and 1477 (Cham), Zug had acquired various districts in its own neighborhood, principally to the north and the west, which were ruled till 1798 by the town alone as subject lands.

In 1478, the building of a larger town wall began, which increased the town area six-fold – the same year as the building of the late gothic St. Oswald Church began. The building master of the new town wall was Hans Felder from Bavarian Swabia. The ground plan of the town wall is indicative of an ideal symmetric plan of the Renaissance period – something very rare at that time. The overall urban planning implemented in the small town of Zug was modern for its time.

The Reformation and early modern era
During the turmoil of the Reformation, Zug remained on the Catholic side of central Switzerland and retained the old faith. Warring religious confederates fought at Kappel am Albis (1531) and at Gubel in Menzingen. Its location on the edge of central Switzerland made Zug a confessional border town. During the Reformation, Zug clung to the old faith and was a member of the Christliche Vereinigung of 1529. In 1586, it became a member of the Golden League.

The period up until 1798 was marked by internal political rivalries and turbulence. The invasion of the French troops marked the end of the old order, and with the Helvetic order came a radical political change. Zug became part of the canton Waldstätten, and the cantonal capital for a short time. After a 50-year struggle between federalism and centralism, between confederation and central state, between conservative and liberal-radical vision, in 1848, today's federal government of Switzerland emerged. Zug was given its current cantonal structure, consisting of eleven local municipalities.

Industrialisation and internationalisation

Until well into the 19th century, Zug consisted of agricultural land. Actual industrialization began with the entrepreneur Wolfgang Henggeler, who in 1834 built a cotton mill in Unterägeri. This was followed by the two companies in Neuägeri and Baar. In 1866, the American George Ham Page founded the first European condensed milk factory in Cham, which later merged with Nestlé. Industry in Zug was dominated by the company Landis+Gyr, founded in 1896, and now owned by Toshiba. The connection to the Swiss railway network in 1864 was important, as was the connection of mountain and valley with an electric tram at the beginning of the 20th century.

In the second half of the century, dynamic expansion took place and Zug became a national and international financial and trading centre, aided by its proximity to Zürich, and by an attractive tax policy. In parallel, large industrial and commercial zones evolved; employment increased rapidly; the population rose sharply, and the building boom skyrocketed. Canton Zug catapulted itself into being at the top of the financially strong cantons. And the town today has become, as the British Guardian once wrote, 'a compass of the global economy'.

Today
Zug is a low tax region and is headquarters for a number of multinational enterprises. The Expat City Ranking in 2019, based on a study of more than 20,000 respondents, rated the quality of life in Zug highest among all cities in the survey. The town's best-known agricultural product is Kirsch.

On 27 September 2001, an angry, unstable gunman, Friedrich Leibacher, shot and killed 15 people including himself in the cantonal parliament of Zug. The event became known as the Zug Massacre.

Geography

Topography

Of this area, about 33.1% is used for agricultural purposes, while 37.9% is forested. Of the rest of the land, 26.6% is settled (buildings or roads) and 2.5% is unproductive land. Of the agricultural land,  is used for orchards and vineyards,  is fields and grasslands and  consists of alpine grazing areas. Rivers and lakes cover  in the municipality.

Climate

See also climate of Lucerne and Zürich.

Weather
Zug has an average of 136.1 days of rain per year and on average receives  of precipitation. It has an average of 5.5 days per year with visibility reduced to less than 1 km, the international definition of fog. During this month there is precipitation for an average of 12.7 days. The month with the most days of precipitation is June, with an average of 13.7, but with only  of precipitation.

Politics

Government
The City Council (Stadtrat) constitutes the executive government of the Town of Zug and operates as a collegiate authority. It is composed of five councillors, each presiding over a department (Departement) comprising several bureaus. The president of the executive department acts as mayor (Stadtpräsident). In the mandate period 2015–2018 (Legislatur) the City Council is presided by Stadtpräsident Karl Kobelt. Departmental tasks, coordination measures and implementation of laws decreed by the Grand Municipal Council are carried by the City Council. The regular election of the City Council by any inhabitant valid to vote is held every four years. The current mandate period (Legislatur) is from 2019 to 2022. Any resident of Zug allowed to vote can be elected as a member of the City Council. The delegates are selected by means of a system of Majorz (since 2014). The mayor is elected as such as well by public election while the heads of the other departments are assigned by the collegiate. The executive body holds its meetings in the Stadthaus (Town Hall) on Kolinplatz., Zug's City Council is made up of two of FDP (FDP.The Liberals, of whom one is also the mayor), and one each of CVP (Christian Democratic Party), CSP (Christian Social Party), and SVP (Swiss People's Party). The last regular election was held on 7 October 2018.

Martin Würmli is Town Chronicler (Stadtschreiber) since 2014 and presides the Town Office (Stadtkanzlei). He has been elected by the collegiate.

Parliament

Federal elections

National Council
In the 2015 federal election the most popular party was the SVP with 25.4% of the vote. The next three most popular parties were the CVP (22.5%), the FDP (19.5%) and the SP (17.2%). In the federal election, a total of 9,438 votes were cast, and the voter turnout was 55.4%. The 2015 election saw a large change in the voting when compared to 2011. The percentage of the vote received by the SP increased sharply from 6.4% in 2011 to 17.2% in 2015, while the percentage that the GPS received dropped from 21.3% to 9.5%.

International relations

Twin towns – Sister cities
After World War II, Zug helped the town of Fürstenfeld, Styria in Austria. In 1986 they decided to become sister cities.
  Fürstenfeld, Styria in Austria, 1986
  Kalesija, Bosnia-Herzegowina, 2008

Demographics

, 31.7% of which are foreign nationals. Over the last 10 years the population has grown at a rate of 11.4%. Most of the population speaks German (81.8%), with Italian being second most common (3.8%) and Serbo-Croatian being third (3.2%).

In Zug about 76% of the population (between age 25–64) have completed either non-mandatory upper secondary education or additional higher education (either university or a Fachhochschule).

Zug has an unemployment rate of 2.28%. , there were 172 people employed in the primary economic sector and about 51 businesses involved in this sector. 5,821 people are employed in the secondary sector and there are 269 businesses in this sector. 21,445 people are employed in the tertiary sector, with 3,205 businesses in this sector.

Sport 
Zug is known as a hockey town in Switzerland. The town's main team is EV Zug, which plays in the National League (NL). They play their home games in the 7,200-seat Bossard Arena. Their affiliate team, the EV Zug Academy, competes in the Swiss League (SL) and their home games are either held in the 7,200-seat Bossard Arena or in the 1,500-seat Academy Arena. EV Zug II plays in the Second Regio League, the fifth highest league in Switzerland. Their home games are held in the Academy Arena. HC Zugerland plays in the Third Regio League, the sixth highest league in Switzerland. The team plays its home games in the Bossard Arena. Zug also has numerous junior teams that compete in the different junior leagues of Switzerland.

There are also an amateur association football team, Zug 94, which was formed in 1994 and two amateur Rugby Teams, the Rugby Club Zug, which has a junior team, The Saints Rugby School and the Rugby Bombers Zug, which was founded by former members of the Rugby Club Zug. Additionally there is an amateur floorball team, Zug United. Zug has a rowing club See-Club Zug, which is repeatedly the highest ranked rowing club in Switzerland.

Economy

, there were a total of 40,166 people employed in the municipality. Of these, a total of 142 people worked in 42 businesses in the primary economic sector. The secondary sector employed 5,939 workers in 351 separate businesses. Finally, the tertiary sector provided 34,085 jobs in 6,592 businesses. In 2013 a total of 15.3% of the population received social assistance.

Since 2016, Zug has accepted digital currency, first for small payments of municipal fees up to CH200. To reduce risk, Zug immediately converts any cryptocurrency received into Swiss francs. This is part of a strategy to associate Zug with new technologies.
Zug is a popular location for incorporation of companies, such as Siemens Building Technologies, and Nord Stream AG. Zug has also been referred to as Crypto Valley because of the large number of companies engaged in cryptocurrency in the city. These include Ethereum, Cardano, Polkadot and Bitcoin Suisse. By 2018, a Crypto Valley Association had been formed, with Oliver Bussmann as its president.

Culture

Situation
The lake shore has been embanked and forms a promenade, from which views of the Rigi and Pilatus, as well as of the snowy peaks of the Bernese Oberland, are gained. Towards its northerly end, a monument marks the spot where a part of the shore slipped into the lake in 1887.

The older part of the town is rather crowded together, though only four of the wall towers and a small part of the town walls still survive.

The most striking old building in the town is the parish church of St Oswald (late 15th century), dedicated to St Oswald, king of Northumbria (d. 642), one of whose arms was brought to Zug in 1485. The town hall, also a 15th-century building, now houses the Historical and Antiquarian Museum. There are some quaint old painted houses close by. A little way higher up the hillside is a Capuchin convent in a striking position, close to the town wall and leaning against it. Still higher, and outside the old town, is the fine new parish church of St Michael, consecrated in 1902.

The business quarter is on the rising ground north of the old town, near the railway station. Several fine modern buildings rise on or close to the shore in the town and to its south, whilst to the southwest is a convent of Capuchin nuns, who manage a large girls' school and several other educational establishments.

The Museum of Prehistory Zug houses an important collection of archaeological remains, especially from the late Bronze Age (urnfield culture) settlement of Zug-Sumpf. Many of Catharine II of Russia's relatives descended from Zug and became known as the Volga Germans.

Museums
There are three museums in the town: the Museum of Prehistory, which displays archaeological finds from Canton Zug; the castle houses the Museum of Cultural History of the town and Canton Zug, and the Zug Art Gallery attracts visitors with its exhibitions. Several municipalities also have their own local museum. The Casino Theatre in Zug and the Zug Burgbachkeller, along with the Chollerhalle cultural center, are the most famous establishments. The event centers in Baar, Cham and Rotkreuz and the Zug youth scene (Galvanik, Podium Industrie 45) enrich the range of cultural events.

Zug is surrounded with mountains, rivers and lakes including the mountains Zugerberg and the Walchwilerberg Oberallmig, the Höhronen and the river Sihl. The Choller nature reserve is also near Lake Zug.

Sights within the town include the late Gothic church of St. Wolfgang, near Hühnenberg, or St. Oswald in Zug, the old town of Zug with the Town Hall and the Zytturm (clock tower), the Huwiler Tower, the Zurlaubenhof, feudal estate of the family Zurlauben, on the outskirts of the town.

Zug's culture also includes the famous Zuger cherry liqueur cake. Local specialties, in addition to the cherry and the cherry liqueur cake, include the Zug 'Rötel', a fine lake charfish, found on many menus.

The IG Culture Zug society, an umbrella organization of museums, theaters, orchestras and other cultural organizations, was founded in Zug in 1995. The society publishes calendars and a magazine of cultural events in the canton. In 2019 it had 167 members.

Heritage sites
There are a number of Swiss heritage sites of national significance in Zug. These include two libraries, the Library of the former Capuchin monastery and the library of the parish church of St. Michael. One archeological site, the Sumpf a late Bronze Age lake shore settlement, is included, as are three museums; the Burg (Castle museum), Kunsthaus (Art museum) and Museum für Urgeschichte (Museum for ancient history). There are three archives that are included in the list; Bürgerarchiv Zug (Citizen's archive of Zug), Staatsarchiv Zug (State/Canton of Zug archive) and the Unternehmensarchiv der Landis & Gyr AG (Landis & Gyr AG company archives). The rest of the sites are the Catholic Church of St. Oswald with Charnel house, the Seminary of St. Michael, the town walls and several buildings in the old town of Zug.

The prehistoric settlements at Oterswil/Insel Eielen, Riedmatt and Sumpf are part of the Prehistoric Pile dwellings around the Alps a UNESCO World Heritage Site.

Education
The Zug education system is based on equal abilities and includes compulsory primary and secondary school, with optional secondary education and vocational training. Two thirds of young people go into vocational education, connected to an apprenticeship, joining the professional world after the 9th grade of secondary school. The international business community of Zug offers many and varied apprenticeships along with the Zug technical and industrial college, GIBZ, and the business college, KBZ, provide the academic knowledge and skills.

Zug has a long tradition of education. Private schools, like the Montana Institute Zug, on Zugerberg, International School of Zug or Lucerne (ISZL), or the Dr. Pfister Institute AG, Oberägeri supplement the range available. In addition, there are the three former non-state teacher training colleges in Menzingen, Holy Cross in Cham and St. Michael in Zug.

Tertiary education
Canton Zug has two high schools: the Canton High School in the town of Zug, and the Cantonal School in Menzingen. Also at higher secondary level, is the Vocational School Zug and the Business Studies School, incorporated within the Canton School. Zug is one of the university cantons, with, on the one hand, the University of Teacher Training, PHZ Zug, on the other, a polytechnic for financial services.

There are also six technical colleges (for business, computer science, engineering design, naturopathy and homeopathy, child education, and rescue services).

International Schools
The range of educational institutions is a key factor for location in the globalized world of competition, especially for foreign employees, the so-called 'Expats'. The four international schools have been developed accordingly, and report a high student intake.

Transportation

Zug acts as an important transportation node.

An extensive bus network within the town and canton is provided by ZVB Zugerland Verkehrsbetriebe.

The Swiss Federal Railways link at Zug railway station for Cham – Horgen – Zürich, Steinhausen – Affoltern am Albis, Arth-Goldau – St. Gotthard – Ticino and Italy, and Rotkreuz – Luzern. Zug is the hub of the Zug Stadtbahn (an S-Bahn-style commuter rail network). The network consisted of the following lines:
 : Baar–Zug–Cham–Rotkreuz–(Luzern)  (also  of the Lucerne S-Bahn)
 : Baar Lindenpark–Zug–Walchwil–Arth-Goldau–(Erstfeld)

Zug is also at the end of Zürich S-Bahn suburban railway network, on lines S5 and S24.

The Zugerbergbahn is a funicular linking the Zug suburb of Schönegg (558 m) with the Vordergeissboden (literally: anterior goat terrain, 925 m), the plateau of the Zugerberg overlooking the town and Lake Zug.

The A4 motorway and other main roads connect Zug with the rest of the nation.

Water transportation on Lake Zug is centred on the town, with public transport on the lake provided by (Motor Ship) MS Zug, MS Schwyz, MS Rigi and MS Schwan. These vessels belong to the Zugersee Schifffahrt, a partner of the local public transport executive, ZVB Zugerland Verkehrsbetriebe.

Notable people 

 Johannes Brandenberg (1660–1729), a painter of pastoral subjects, historical pictures and battle-pieces
 Béat Fidèle Antoine Jean Dominique de La Tour-Châtillon de Zurlauben (1720–1799) soldier in the French army and Swiss historian
 Henric Trenk (1818–1892), a Romanian painter and graphic artist of Romantic landscapes
 Walo Lüönd (1927-2012), a movie actor
 Marc Rich (1934–2013), controversial businessman, founded Glencore (the largest company in Switzerland) and funded the early-growth of Kanton Zug.
 Friedrich Leibacher (1944–2001), a mass murderer in the Zug massacre
 Carl Rütti (born 1949), a notable composer who writes choral music
 Simonetta Sommaruga (born 1960), a politician, current member of the Swiss Federal Council, became President of the Swiss Confederation in 2015
 Roland Dahinden (born 1962), a trombonist and composer
 Severin Hacker (born 1984), a computer scientist, co-founded Duolingo
 Max Husmann, (1888-1965), Swiss peacemaker (Operation Sunrise), educator and founder of Institut Montana Zugerberg
 Mirjam Indermaur (born 1967), Swiss businesswoman and writer

 Sport
 Georges Stuber (1925–2006), a football goalkeeper who played 14 times for Switzerland
 Karl Fridlin (born 1935), a former swimmer, competed at the 1960 Summer Olympics
 Fritz Schmid (born 1959), a football coach, currently the manager of the New Zealand national football team
 Lionel Donato (born 1964), Swiss former professional footballer
 Patrick Fischer (born 1975), head coach of the Swiss national ice hockey team
 Nadia Styger (born 1978), a former World Cup alpine ski racer.
 Christoph Schmid (born 1982), a sport shooter, competed in the 2008 Summer Olympics
 Sibylle Scherer (born 1992), a handballer who plays for LK Zug and the Switzerland national team

Notes and references

Notes

References

Bibliography

External links

  
 ZVB Zugerland Verkehrsbetriebe
 Pictures and history Zytturm 

 
1350s establishments in the Holy Roman Empire
1352 establishments in Europe
14th-century establishments in the Old Swiss Confederacy
600s establishments
7th-century establishments in Switzerland
Canton of Zug
Cantonal capitals of Switzerland
Cities in Switzerland
Free imperial cities
Municipalities of the canton of Zug
Populated places established in the 7th century
Populated places on Lake Zug